Ptilochaeta nudipes is a species of plant in the Malpighiaceae family. It is found in Argentina and Bolivia. It is threatened by habitat loss from agricultural activities.

References

Malpighiaceae
Vulnerable plants
Taxonomy articles created by Polbot